Gregorio de Falco (born 8 March 1965) is an Italian naval officer and politician who was formerly a member of the Italian Senate. He is best known for his intervention in the attempt to solve the Costa Concordia disaster in January 2012.

Early life and education 
After graduating in Law at the University of Milan, De Falco joined the Corps of the Port Captaincies in Livorno in 1994, studying at the Naval Academy.

Career 
In 2000, De Falco left Livorno and joined the Captaincy in Genoa.

With the rank of lieutenant, De Falco was assigned the Command in Santa Margherita Ligure, where he stood from 2003 to 2005.

Costa Concordia disaster 
On 13 January 2012, the Costa Concordia cruise ship, owned by the Costa Crociere shipping company and under the command of Captain Francesco Schettino, impacted a rock in the waters of Isola del Giglio, reporting the opening of a 36-meter-long hole on the left side, followed by the partial submersion of the ship.

De Falco, who led the Captaincy in Livorno, assumed the coordination of the rescues to the cruise unit in difficulty. During the radio and telephone communications between the operating room of the Livorno Captaincy and the Costa Concordia, taken by De Falco and Schettino, De Falco repeatedly ordered Schettino, who had abandoned ship, to return to the vessel and take charge of the ongoing passenger evacuation. De Falco's exasperated order  ("Get back on board, you prick!" or "Get the fuck [back] on board!") became very popular.

Political career 
De Falco ran for a seat in the Senate with the Five Star Movement in the 2018 general election and was elected.

He was a member of the left-wing of the Movement and is considered to be very close to the President of the Chamber of Deputies Roberto Fico. On 31 December 2018, De Falco was expelled from the Movement after being accused of having violated its code of ethics several times. In an interview, he declared that he was expelled for voting against the decree "Decreto sicurezza", and accused the Five Star Movement of lacking democracy and freedom of choice.

References

External links 
Files about his parliamentary activities (in Italian): XVIII legislature.

1965 births
Living people
Military personnel from Naples
Five Star Movement politicians
Senators of Legislature XVIII of Italy
21st-century Italian politicians
University of Milan alumni
Politicians from Naples
20th-century Italian people